Qeshlaq-e Tumar Hajj Sad (also Romanized as Qeshlāq-e Tūmār Ḩājj Saʿd) is a village in Qeshlaq-e Shomali Rural District, in the Central District of Parsabad County, Ardabil Province, Iran. At the 2006 census, its population was 161, in 34 families.

References 

Towns and villages in Parsabad County